The 2nd New Zealand Parliament was a term of the Parliament of New Zealand. It opened on 15 April 1856, following New Zealand's 1855 election. It was dissolved on 5 November 1860 in preparation for 1860–61 election. The 2nd Parliament was the first under which New Zealand had responsible government, meaning that unlike previously, the Cabinet was chosen (although not officially appointed) by Parliament rather than by the Governor.

Historical context
At this time political parties had not been established (they were not established until after the 1890 election), meaning that anyone attempting to form an administration had to win support directly from individual MPs. This made forming (and retaining) a government difficult. The Sewell Ministry, the first responsible government, led by Henry Sewell, lasted only two weeks. The first Fox Ministry, the second responsible government, led by William Fox, also lasted only two weeks. The third responsible government, the first Stafford Ministry, led by Edward Stafford, was more stable, governing for the remainder of the 2nd Parliament and for the beginning of the 3rd.

Parliamentary sessions

Parliament sat for three sessions:

Electoral boundaries for the 2nd Parliament
The 2nd Parliament, which initially used the same electoral boundaries as the 1st Parliament, consisted of thirty-seven representatives representing twenty-four electorates. Two regions of the colony (the inland regions of the lower North Island and the north-west corner of the South Island) were not part of any electorate, and so were not represented.

The 1858 Amendment changed the boundaries to:

Initial composition of the 2nd Parliament

Changes during term

The turnover of MPs was very high in the 2nd Parliament, with 32 by-elections and a supplementary election being held. This situation was partly the result of a redistribution of boundaries to seven electorates, and the creation of four new electorates – agreed upon in the Electoral Districts Act, 1858, with the total number of MPs in Parliament rising from 37 to 41, and the number of electorates rising from 24 to 28. The northern portion of the Northern Division electorate was split off and became the electorate of Marsden.

In the South Island, the southern portion of Wairau electorate, plus part of Christchurch Country, became the new Cheviot electorate. The western portion of Dunedin Country was split off and became the new Wallace electorate. The northwest of the South Island remained the colony's only territory not part of an electorate.

Members of Parliament belonging to one of the electorates that was split could choose which of the two new electorates they would want to represent, and by-elections were held during 1859 in the thus unrepresented electorates.

At the opening of the 6th session of the Parliament on 10 April 1858, the speaker read out 14 resignations.

Existing electorates

Akaroa
Cuff resigned in 1858 and was succeeded by William Sefton Moorhouse.

Auckland Suburbs
Merriman resigned on 13 March 1860. He was succeeded by Joseph Hargreaves, who was elected on 5 April 1860, and resigned on 24 July 1860. Hargreaves was replaced by Logan Campbell, who was returned unopposed on 4 August 1860.

Brodie resigned on 6 December 1859 and was succeeded by Theophilus Heale.

Christchurch Country
Brittin resigned in 1856, returned to England on 'urgent business' and did not return to New Zealand. He was succeeded in 1856 by John Ollivier, who himself resigned in 1860. Ollivier was succeeded by Isaac Cookson.

Hall resigned in 1860 and was succeeded by Charles Hunter Brown.

City of Auckland
Campbell resigned in 1858. He was succeeded by Thomas Forsaith.

Beckham resigned in 1859. He was succeeded by Archibald Clark.

City of Wellington
In 1858, Featherston and Fitzherbert resigned their seats in Parliament. Featherston apparently wanted to return to England. Instead, he successfully stood for re-election within months. The other person returned in the same by-election was William Barnard Rhodes.

County of Hawke
The renamed County of Hawke (it had previously been Wairarapa and Hawkes Bay, until its southern portion was made into the separate electorate of Wairarapa). Thomas Henry FitzGerald was elected as its representative on 26 April 1860.

Dunedin Country
John and his father William Cargill resigned in 1858 and October 1859, respectively. The first vacancy was filled by John Parkin Taylor, who retired from parliament at the end of this term. The second vacancy was filled by Thomas Gillies.

Grey and Bell
Brown resigned on 16 August 1856 to (unsuccessfully) contest the Taranaki superintendency. He was again elected in 1858 and resigned in 1860, when his militia service required his full attention. In between Brown's terms, John Lewthwaite (who resigned in 1858) represented the electorate.

Hutt
Bell resigned in 1858 and was succeeded by William Fitzherbert. Ludlam, the other representative of Hutt, resigned in 1856 and was replaced by Samuel Revans, who resigned again on 22 March 1858 and was succeeded by Alfred Renall.

Motueka and Massacre Bay
Parker resigned in 1856 and was succeeded by Herbert Curtis.

Omata
East resigned in 1860. The subsequent by-election on 16 April 1860 was won unopposed by James Crowe Richmond.

Pensioner Settlements
Greenwood resigned and Captain Jermyn Symonds was elected on 30 April 1858.

Southern Division
Taylor resigned on 13 April 1858 and was succeeded through an 1858 by-election by Theodore Haultain.

Town of Christchurch
Sewell resigned his seat in late 1856 to return to England. He was succeeded by Richard Packer. Packer resigned in 1859. Sewell, having returned from England, won the 1860 by-election. He did not seek re-election at the end of the term, but was appointed Registrar-General of Lands towards the end of 1860.

Town of Dunedin
Macandrew resigned on 2 November 1858. He successfully contested the January 1859 by-election in the same electorate.

Town of Lyttelton
FitzGerald] resigned in 1857 due to ill health. Crosbie Ward won the resulting by-election in May 1858.

Waimea
Elliot resigned in 1858. He was succeeded by David Monro, who had already represented the electorate in the 1st Parliament.

Travers resigned in 1859 and was succeeded by Fedor Kelling.

Wairarapa and Hawkes Bay
Smith resigned on 10 March 1858. He was succeeded by James Burne Ferguson.

Wairau
Wells resigned in 1858. He was succeeded by Frederick Weld, who had already represented the electorate in the 1st Parliament.

Wellington Country
Ward resigned on 22 March 1858. He was succeeded by Alfred Brandon.

New electorates

Cheviot
Cheviot was first created in 1859, with Edward Jollie its first representative.

Marsden
Marsden was established in 1859. James Farmer was the first representative, elected on 16 December 1859.

Wairarapa
The Wairarapa electorate was created in 1859. Charles Carter was the first elected representative.

Wallace
The Wallace electorate was created in 1859 and the first elections held on 30 November. Dillon Bell was the first elected representative.

Notes

References

External links
Cartoon of drunk MP, 1856 by Alfred Domett

02